Hypargos is a genus of small seed-eating birds in the family Estrildidae that are found in Sub-Saharan Africa.

There are species with the common name of twinspot in other genera within the Estrildidae family.

Taxonomy
The genus Hypargos was introduced in 1862 by the German naturalist Ludwig Reichenbach to accommodate the pink-throated twinspot. The name combines the Ancient Greek hypo meaning "beneath" with Argos from Argus Panoptes, the many-eyed giant in Greek mythology. The genus Hypargos is sister to the genus Euschistospiza which contains two more species with "twinspot" in their common name.

Species
The genus contains two species:

References

External links
 
 

 
 
Taxa named by Ludwig Reichenbach